Ridgeview High School is a four-year public high school located in the Clay County School District. The schools mascot is the panther (nicknamed Slash). Ridgeview had approximately 1,600 students for the 2014–2015 school year,  Ridgeview is currently rated an A-school on the FCAT 2.0 grading scale.  Deborah Segreto replaced retiring principal, John Westmoreland in 2012. Later in 2019, Becky Murphy replaced former principal, Deborah Segreto.

Academies
Ridgeview has two academies:

Academy of Culinary Arts (ACA) - The course provides students with fundamental skills in culinary, restaurant, business management, and life. Promoting professionalism through student involvement within culinary endeavors as well as encouraging post-secondary student education and future careers within the culinary and hospitality industries.

The academies allow high school students, regardless of address, to attend from all over the district, providing that the student is accepted into the academy.

International Baccalaureate Program (IB)
Ridgeview High School is the only high school within the Clay County School district to offer the IB program. Like the academies, high school students from all over the district may attend, provided that the student is accepted into the Pre-IB/IB program.

Fine Arts
Ridgeview High School fine arts programs include band, drama and chorus.

Career and Technology Education (CTE)
Ridgeview High School CTE programs include Early Childhood Education, Business Education Programs, Construction Technology, and Heating & Air Conditioning.

Athletics
Ridgeview has several sports teams including cross country, football, golf, slow and fast pitch softball, swimming, volleyball, basketball, soccer, weightlifting, wrestling, baseball, tennis, and track.

References

High schools in Clay County, Florida
Public high schools in Florida